Inner Line Permit (ILP) is an official travel document issued by the concerned state government to allow inward travel of an Indian citizen into a protected area for a limited period. It is obligatory for Indian citizens from outside those states to obtain a permit for entering into the protected state. The document is an effort by the government to regulate movement to certain areas located near the international border of India. An ILP is usually significantly easier to obtain than the analogous Protected Area Permit (PAP) which is the document required by non-citizens to enter the same areas.

About

According to the Constitution of India, all Indian citizens are free to live and work in any state of the country, but entry to certain states with a protected status requires authorising by the concerned state government i.e special permissions are required to visit these areas. Such a permit authorising an Indian or foreign citizen to enter a protected area is referred to as an 'inner line permit' as it grants entry to areas lying between the international boundary and the so-called "Inner Line" of the country.

States which require permit

 Arunachal Pradesh — Issued by the secretary (political) of the Government of Arunachal Pradesh. It is required for entering Arunachal Pradesh through any of the check gates across the interstate border with Assam or Nagaland. An ILP for temporary visitors is valid for 15 days and can be extended, while one for those taking employment in the state and their immediate family members is valid for a year. The Arunachal Pradesh government is planning to implement a permit-on-arrival system.
 Mizoram — Issued by the Government of Mizoram. It is required for entering Mizoram through any of the check gates across the inter-State borders. Typically, a "Temporary ILP" is issued to visitors, which is valid for 15 days and can be extended another 15 days, with the possibility of extending it to one month in exceptional circumstances. However, with the sponsorship of a local resident or government department, a "Regular ILP" can be procured, which is valid for 6 months and can be renewed twice for another 6 months each. If arriving by air, an ILP can be obtained on arrival at Lengpui Airport in Aizawl.
 Nagaland — Issued by the Government of Nagaland. The Regulation makes it obligatory for anyone, both Indian Citizen and Foreigner, who is not an indigenous inhabitant of Nagaland, to obtain an Inner Line Permit (ILP) in such form, and with such conditions, as may be prescribed by the Government of Nagaland, to enter the state of Nagaland for a limited period.
 Manipur — Issued by the Government of Manipur. The Inner Line Permit (ILP) regime was extended to Manipur on 11 December 2019 with President Ram Nath Kovind signing the order in this effect. The decision comes two days after Union Home Minister Amit Shah announced in Lok Sabha that the ILP would be extended to the northeastern state. Manipur is the fourth state after Arunachal Pradesh, Nagaland and Mizoram where the ILP regime is applicable.
Lakshadweep - Issued by the government of Lakshadweep. Inner line permit is mandatory for entering in to this island territory. It is very tough to get an ILP for Lakshadweep because it has many rules and regulations to be fulfilled.
An ILP was previously required for certain parts of the Leh district in Ladakh. This requirement was abolished by a circular issued by district magistrate which took effect from 1 May 2014, although foreign nationals are required to get Protected Area Permit for this region. The ILP was implemented again in 2017 only to be removed again in 2021.

Demands for ILP in other states
There are ongoing demands for the introduction of ILP in Karnataka, Tamilnadu,Meghalaya and Assam  to regulate entry of outsiders into the state.

See also 

 Protected area permit

References

External links 
 Apply for Inner Line Permit for Arunachal Pradesh
 Apply for Inner Line Permit for Mizoram
 Apply for Inner Line Permit for Nagaland

Government of India
Tourism in India
Tourism in Arunachal Pradesh